Tathagata Mukherjee (born 15 May 1985) is a Kolkata-based Indian actor and independent filmmaker. He is best known for his acting in several Bengali soap operas.

Early life
Tathagata Mukherjee was born on May 15th, 1985, in Kolkata, India. During his childhood, he did a three years long yatra with a Bengali drag artist Chapal Bhaduri. He went to high school at the Baranagore Ramakrishna Mission Ashrama High School. Later, he studied drama at Rabindra Bharati University. He has done professional theatre since 2005.

Career

His career as a film actor began when he was cast in the 2007 movie Laal Ronger Duniya. 

In 2008, he started his television career as a hero in a daily soap called Sada Patay Kalo Daag. After that, he did many telefilms and soaps. Bou Kotha Kao (2009) which became a turning point in his career. He then played lead characters in Payer Tolar Mati, Harano Sur, Kon Kanoner Phool, Sokhi, Choukath and Care Kori Na. He did cameos in Agnipariksha and Tumi Asbe Bole.

Television (daily soaps)

 Sada Patay Kalo Daag as Ayan
 Rajpoth
 Bou Kotha Kao as Rudro
 Payer Tolar Mati
 Kon Kanoner Phool as Manav
 Labonyer Sangsar
 Choukath
 Agnipariksha (guest appearance)
 Care Kori Na as Ronit 
 Sokhi as Akash Majumder
 Harano Sur as Sudipto
 Raashi as Debobrato Bose, alias, Dev.
 Mon Niye Kachakachi as Ranbir Kapoor
 Tumi Asbe Bole (guest appearance)
 Sadhok bamakhyapa as Tarapodo
 Swapno Uran as Arnob
 Bhakter Bhogobaan Shri Krishna as Duryodhon
 Raadha (TV Series) as Rana
 Kusum Dola as Kanaiha aka Krishnomoy
 Andarmahal as Tirthonkar
 Mayurpankhi as Shyam Sundar Ghosh aka Shyam
 Mohor as Ahir Dasgupta
 Kora Pakhi as Deepjoy
 Desher Maati as Dodo

 Guddi as Aabir Chatterjee aka Tutul
 Dhulokona as Ankur Chatterjee 
 Balijhor as Barshan

Filmography

Actor

 Badshahi Angti as Mahabir Seth
 Force as Shibaji
 Bastav as Rik
 Laal ronger Duniya as Himan
 The Best Seller
 Paan Supari as Sunny aka Sandip
 Parokiya as Bivas
 Sin Sister (2020) as Durjoy Mitra

Director

 Shuyopoka (The Inmate) (2016) 
 Geodesy (2017)
 Jingle bells qwali (music video) (2017)
 Vandemataram and Kothbiro (Music video (2017)
 Holi bol (Music video) (2017)
 Buno (2018)
 How To Become a Rapist (2018)
 Unicorn (film)
 Kalboishakhi (2018, musical)
 Make a Noise (2018, music video)
 Water Bottle (2019, web series)
 Bhotboti (2022)
 Memory X
 Gopone Mod Chharan
 Pariah

References

External links

 
 Tathagata Mukherjee on Facebook
 Tathagata Mukherjee on Twitter
 

Living people
Male actors in Bengali cinema
Bengali male actors
Indian male film actors
People from Dhaka
Male actors from Kolkata
Ramakrishna Mission schools alumni
Rabindra Bharati University alumni
1985 births
Indian male television actors
Bengali male television actors
Indian male soap opera actors
Film directors from Kolkata
Bengali film directors
Baranagore Ramakrishna Mission Ashrama High School alumni